St. Michael-Albertville Schools (District 885 or STMA Schools) is a school district headquartered in Albertville, Minnesota. In addition to all of Albertville, the district includes most of St. Michael. It also includes sections of the following: Hanover, Monticello Township, and Otsego.

In 2016 Ann-Marie Foucalt became the superintendent, effective July 1. All members of the school board voted to hire her.

Circa 2018/2019 it had 6,503 students, an increase by 97 from the previous year. Foucalt stated that the open enrollment program attracted students who live outside of the district to the district's schools.

Schools
 Secondary
 St. Michael-Albertville High School
 Middle School East
 Middle School West

 Primary
 Big Woods Elementary School
 Fieldstone Elementary School
 St. Michael Elementary School
 Albertville Primary School

References

External links
 St. Michael-Albertville Schools
School districts in Minnesota
Education in Wright County, Minnesota